Por un beso (For One Kiss) is a Mexican telenovela produced by Angelli Nesma Medina for Televisa in 2000. Based on La gata by Inés Rodena. It premiered on November 13, 2000 and ended on March 30, 2001.

Natalia Esperón and Víctor Noriega starred as protagonists, while Enrique Rocha and Mercedes Molto starred as antagonists.

Plot 
Blanca Garza is a beautiful singer. Her boyfriend, Mariano Díaz de León, is a famous architect, she loves him, but doesn't know that he has been lying to her all the time and he is married and has 2 sons. Julio, the childhood friend of Mariano's wife came to visit her after he inherited a lot of money from his father.

He meets Blanca and falls in love with her. Meanwhile, Blanca discovers that Mariano is married, breaks up with him and starts going out with Julio, finally falling in love with him. They happily marry and are expecting a baby. Mariano is furious and wants a revenge. He convinces Julio to invest all his money in a construction with the illegal endorsements, but Julio is not aware about it.

There was an accident at the construction and one worker dies. The police is after Julio, as the construction is in his name, he confronts Mariano's partner about this illegal construction and during the fight between them, Mariano's partner falls out of the window and dies.

Though it was an accident, but Julio was sent to prison for many years, as Mariano declares against him and also finds him the worst attorney he possibly can. After Blanca gives birth to a baby girl; Azucena, Mariano visits her in the hospital, and she realizes that it was all his fault.

The villain chokes her, saying "if you are not going to be mine, you are going to be nobody's". Blanca dies. Mariano gives money to a personal assistant of Blanca so she disappears with a newborn baby. Twenty years later Azucena turns into a beautiful girl, looking exactly like her mother.

She has no idea that her father is alive and he is in jail, she thinks he is dead. She meets Mariano's son, Daniel, and they fall in love. But soon Julio gets out of the jail, finds his daughter, Mariano finds out that Daniel is in love with the daughter of his worst enemy and the endless hatred and revenge between 2 families continues.

Cast 
 
Natalia Esperón as Blanca Garza de Otero Robles/Azucena Otero Robles Garza
Víctor Noriega as Daniel Díaz de León Lavalle
Mercedes Molto as Mirna Ballesteros Mendizábal
Enrique Rocha as Mariano Díaz de León
Otto Sirgo as Julio Otero Robles/Gonzalo Ruiz de Cota
Lourdes Munguía as Prudencia Aguilar
Luz Elena González as Rita Jiménez de Ornelas
Alejandra Meyer as Micaela 'Mica' Ornelas
Óscar Morelli as Don Clemente Fuentes
Luz María Jerez as Fernanda Lavalle de Díaz De León
Felicia Mercado as Eugenia Mendizábal de Ballesteros
Carlos Monden as Ignacio Ballesteros
Melba Luna as Yolanda Uribe
Héctor Cruz as Det. Romero Gil
Gerardo Albarrán as Samuel López
Gustavo Rojo as Lic. Carlos Guillén
Alicia Fahr as Gloria
Patricio Castillo as Antonio Ramírez Lugo "El Padrino"
Raúl Magaña as David Díaz de León Lavalle
Jorge Poza as Agustin Aguilar
Benjamín Rivero as Luis Ponce "El Duende"
Giovan D'Angelo as Ricardo Leyva
Condorito Jr. as Juan Téllez
Vilma Sotomayor as Sonia
Margarita Magaña as Loreta Mendiola
Julio Mannino as Ernesto "Neto" Ornelas
Juan Carlos Bonet as Mariano Díaz de León (young)
Ernesto Godoy as Julio Otero Robles (young)
Dominika Paleta as Fernanda Lavalle de Díaz de León (young)
Polly as Micaela Ornelas (young)
Oscar Traven as Efraín Ayala
Guillermo Aguilar as Dr. Guízar
Jordi Landeta as Daniel Díaz de León Lavalle (child)
Ximena Adriana as  Azucena Garza (child)
Jorge Trejo as Ernesto "Neto" Ornelas (child)
Mauricio Aspe as Anselmo
Arlette Pacheco as Malena
Ramón Menéndez as Dr. Lavat
Alejandra Barros as Thelma
Elizabeth Aguilar as Mrs. Encino
Ricardo Vera as Alfonso Nájera
Alfonso Iturralde as Octavio Mendiola
Pablo Alejandro Byrne as  Agustín (child)
Silvia Valdez as Yolanda (young)
Rosángela Balbó as Dr. Guzmán
Arleth Terán as Brisia
César Castro as Lic. Urquiza
Rafael del Villar as Félix
Carmelita González as Elodia
Mario Iván Martínez as Francesco
Lourdes Reyes as Estela Hidalgo
Sergio Sánchez as Miguel Ángel Bouvier
Irma Torres as Leonora
Raúl Valerio as Lic. Tinoco
Jacqueline Voltaire as Mrs. Mier y Terán
Guillermo Zarur as El Abuelo
Kika Edgar as Blanca's voice

References

External links

2000 telenovelas
Mexican telenovelas
2000 Mexican television series debuts
2001 Mexican television series endings
Television shows set in Mexico
Televisa telenovelas
Spanish-language telenovelas